Angèle Albrecht (12 December 1942 – 1 August 2000) was a German ballerina.

Life and career 
Born in Freiburg im Breisgau, Albrecht was the daughter of the Munich painter and stage designer Elmar Albrecht. After training with Lula von Sachnowsky and at the Royal Ballet School in London, she had engagements at the Mannheim National Theatre (1960/61) and at the Hamburg State Opera (1961–1967), where she was discovered as a "great ballerina" under George Balanchine. From 1967 she was a solo dancer in the ballet du XXième siècle by Maurice Béjart in Brussels for many years, where she was successful in Bhakti, Boléro and The Rite of Spring, among others.
Guest tours took her to Berlin and Venice (1964), Spain (1965), Munich (1966) and Zurich (1967) with the ballet of the Hamburg State Opera, and to Denmark, Germany, France, Italy, Canada, Cuba, Luxembourg, Mexico, the Netherlands, Poland and Portugal with the "ballet du XXième siècle" among others.

In 1979, she retired from the stage and founded a ballet school in Brussels, which she gave up in the mid-1980s. She then taught in Munich, among others in the Dance Project and in the Roleff-King Ballet School. She had been married since 1969 to the (exiled) Polish concert pianist and composer Piotr Lachert (later divorced), who dedicated the ballet Angelica to her in 1972. Her son Tigran Albrecht is the offspring of her relationship with the choreographer Lorca Massine, the eldest son of Léonide Massine.

Albrecht died in Munich at the age of 57. Her estate is located in the Deutsches Tanzarchiv Köln.

Repertoire 
 Calliope in Apollon Musagète (George Balanchine) – Hamburg 1962.
 Walzer in Les Sylphides (Michel Fokine) – Hamburg 1962.
 Cholerikerin in Die Vier Temperamente (George Balanchine) – Hamburg 1963.
 Die Nacht in Orpheus und Eurydike (George Balanchine) – Hamburg 1963.
 Ariadne in Bacchus und Ariadne (George Skibine) – Wuppertal 1964.
 Beide Hauptrollen in Concerto barocco (George Balanchine) – Hamburg 1966.
 Hauptrolle in Symphony in C (George Balanchine) – Hamburg 1966.
 Carmen in Carmen (Roland Petit) – Hamburg 1967.
 Anna II in Die Sieben Todsünden (Dragutin Boldin) – Lübeck 1967.
 Die Auserwählte in Sacre du Printemps (Maurice Béjart) – Brüssel 1967.
 Fliederfee in Ni fleurs ni couronnes (Maurice Béjart) – Grenoble 1968.
 La Femme in Baudelaire (Maurice Béjart) – Brüssel 1968.
 Königin Mab in Romeo et Juliette (Maurice Béjart) – Brüssel 1968.
 Shakti in Bhakti (Maurice Béjart) – Avignon 1968.
 Yolande in Les 4 Fils Aymon (Léonide Massine/Paolo Bortoluzzi/Maurice Béjart) – Avignon 1969.
 Elle in Les Vainqueurs (Maurice Béjart) – Brüssel 1969.

Reception 
 Wilfried Hofman: "Angele Albrecht is a stroke of luck: she is an entirely original dancing talent, a woman of high, exotic and yet classical beauty and at the same time a modest, uncorruptible girl".
 Malve Gradinger: "a technically highly brilliant interpreter with a strong personality".

Notes

References

Further reading 
 Max Niehaus: Ballett-Faszination. Ein Kompendium der internationalen Ballett-Szene. Nymphenburger Verlagsbuchhandlung, München 1978, p. 94.
 Horst Koegler and Helmut Günther: Reclams Ballettlexikon. Philipp Reclam jun., Stuttgart 1984, .

External links 
 
 Angèle Albrecht at GDWH
 Angèle Albrecht bei klassik.com
 Bejart and Modernism

German ballerinas
1942 births
2000 deaths
People from Freiburg im Breisgau
20th-century German ballet dancers